Dobromira Danailova (born 24 October 1995) is a Bulgarian recurve archer. She competed in the individual recurve event at the 2015 World Archery Championships in Copenhagen, Denmark, finishing in 113th position overall after being eliminated in the 1/48 round.

References

External links

Bulgarian female archers
Living people
Place of birth missing (living people)
1995 births
Archers at the 2015 European Games
European Games competitors for Bulgaria
Archers at the 2019 European Games